Wang Huaizhong (Chinese: 王怀忠;1 August 1946 – 12 February 2004) was a Chinese politician. A former vice-governor of Anhui, he was executed in 2004 for corruption.

References 

Chinese Communist Party politicians
Chinese politicians executed for corruption
2004 deaths
1946 births